Bârmân In the Great War of Iran and Turan the time of Nowzar was.  In this war he was of the and one of the commanders of the Afrasiab. Iran-Turan war It happened after Manuchehr  death. Until then, Turanian did not dare attack Iran. But after the death of Nowzar Turanians had the opportunity to attack Iran. The King of Iran was killed in the attack and a large part of the country was occupied.

Barman and Qobád
Iran-Turan War that resulted in the annihilation of Nowzar Shah of Iran and the conquest of the country, during the fighting between Barman and Qobad, Qobad the son of Kaveh Ahangar was killed.and Barman was also killed by Qobad brother Qaren.

Bârmân wars
Barman at book Shahnameh  appears in wars in two periods, and  relatively long time apart. The first period is in the time of Nozar, and the second period is in the time of Kay Khosrow. There was another war of Davazdah Rokh in the time of Kay khosrow, in which Barman was killed by Rohham.

Barman, along with Houman, are the names of two Turan brave men in Shahnameh who were commissioned by Afrasiab to prevent Sohrab from approaching his Rostam in a war that. This act led to a fierce battle between Sohrab and Rostam, which ended with the murder of Sohrab.

Gallery

References

Sources
Ferdowsi Shahnameh. From the Moscow version. Mohammed Publishing.

External links

Shahnameh characters
Shahnameh stories